Jičín is a city in the Hradec Králové Region, Czech Republic.

Jičín may also refer to:

Jičíněves, a village in the Hradec Králové Region, Jičín District, Czech Republic
Nový Jičín, a town in the Moravian-Silesian Region, Nový Jičín District, Czech Republic
Starý Jičín, a village in the Moravian-Silesian Region, Nový Jičín District, Czech Republic